Feast of the Seven Fishes is a 2018 American comedy film written and directed by Robert Tinnell and starring Skyler Gisondo, Madison Iseman, Jessica Darrow, Addison Timlin, Josh Helman, Joe Pantoliano, Paul Ben-Victor, and Ray Abruzzo. It marks the film debut of Jessica Darrow. It is based on Tinnell's 2005 Eisner Award nominated graphic novel of the same name.

The film won the Audience Choice Award at the Heartland International Film Festival, 2019.

Plot
Feast of the Seven Fishes is a romantic comedy set in a rust-belt town on the banks of the Monongahela River in 1983.  When a nice, working-class,  Italian-American Catholic boy brings an affluent, Ivy League, Protestant girl to his family’s raucous traditional seafood feast on Christmas Eve, sparks fly.

Cast
Skyler Gisondo as Tony
Madison Iseman as Beth
Addison Timlin as Katie
Josh Helman as Juke
Joe Pantoliano as Uncle Frankie
Paul Ben-Victor as Johnny
Ray Abruzzo as Uncle Carmine
Andrew Schultz as Angelo
Lynn Cohen as Nonnie 
Jessica Darrow as Sarah            
Cameron Rostami as Vince

Production
The film was shot in Marion County, West Virginia, including the towns of Rivesville and Fairmont.

See also
 List of Christmas films

References

External links
 
 

2018 films
American comedy films
Films based on American novels
Films shot in West Virginia
Films about Italian-American culture
Films set in 1983
Films set in Pennsylvania
American Christmas comedy-drama films
2010s Christmas comedy-drama films
2010s English-language films
2010s American films